Gigi Fernández and Martina Navratilova were the defending champions but lost in the third round to Katrina Adams and Manon Bollegraf.

Pam Shriver and Natasha Zvereva won in the final 6–4, 4–6, 7–6(7–5) against Jana Novotná and Larisa Savchenko.

Seeds 
Champion seeds are indicated in bold text while text in italics indicates the round in which those seeds were eliminated.

Draw

Finals

Top half

Section 1

Section 2

Bottom half

Section 3

Section 4

External links 
1991 US Open – Women's draws and results at the International Tennis Federation

Women's Doubles
US Open (tennis) by year – Women's doubles
1991 in women's tennis
1991 in American women's sports